The North Cove Marina is a municipal inland harbor in Manhattan, New York. The marina is primarily for 80 to 150-foot mega-yachts.

History 
Built in 1989, it claimed to be the first European-style mega-yacht harbor in the continental United States. It is located between Brookfield Place buildings and directly in front of the new World Trade Center. During the terrorist attacks on September 11, 2001 it was used to rescue people from the collapse of the World Trade Center.

See also 

 List of marinas

References

External links 

 Official website

Battery Park City
Marinas in New York (state)
Marinas in the United States